Three human polls and one formulaic ranking make up the 2006 NCAA Division I FBS (Football Bowl Subdivision) football rankings, in addition to various publications' preseason polls. Unlike most sports, college football's governing body, the NCAA, does not bestow a National Championship title. That title is bestowed by one or more of four different polling agencies. There are two main weekly polls that begin in the preseason: the AP Poll and the Coaches Poll. About halfway through the season, two additional polls are released, the Harris Interactive Poll and the Bowl Championship Series (BCS) standings. The Harris Poll and Coaches Poll are factors in the BCS standings. At the end of the season, the BCS standings determine who plays in the BCS bowl games as well as the BCS National Championship Game.

Legend

AP Poll

Coaches Poll
Jim Tressel, head coach of the Ohio State Buckeyes, refused to vote in the Week 15 poll, citing a conflict of interest. In a change to the Coaches Poll for the 2006 season, the final ballots are made public. Tressel did not want his vote of picking Florida or Michigan to play against his team to be known publicly and therefore refused to vote and was an unprecedented move in that no Coaches Poll voter has ever refused to vote.

Harris Interactive Poll

BCS standings
The Bowl Championship Series (BCS) determined the two teams that competed in the 2007 BCS National Championship Game.

References

 
 
 
 
 
 

NCAA Division I FBS football rankings
Bowl Championship Series